The 2023 Charlotte Edwards Cup is the upcoming third edition of the Charlotte Edwards Cup, an English women's cricket Twenty20 domestic competition, which will take place between 18 May and 10 June 2023. It will feature eight teams playing in a round-robin group stage, followed by a Finals Day. It will run alongside the Rachael Heyhoe Flint Trophy, as well as featuring double-header matches with the men's T20 Blast. Southern Vipers are the defending champions.

Format
Teams play each other once in a group of eight, with the top three qualifying for the knock-out stage. This represents an addition of one match per team from the previous season, which saw teams divided into two groups of four. The top three teams in the group advance to Finals Day, to be played at New Road, Worcester, with the top-placed team advancing directly to the final and the other two teams playing in the semi-final. 20 group stage matches will be played as double-headers with matches from the men's T20 Blast.

Teams
The teams will be as listed below. The Blaze changed their name prior to the 2023 season, having previously been known as Lightning.
 Central Sparks (representing Warwickshire, Worcestershire, Herefordshire, Shropshire and Staffordshire)
 Northern Diamonds (representing Yorkshire, Durham and Northumberland)
 North West Thunder (representing Lancashire, Cheshire and Cumbria)
 South East Stars (representing Surrey and Kent)
 Southern Vipers (representing Hampshire, Sussex, Berkshire, Buckinghamshire, Dorset, Isle of Wight and Oxfordshire)
 Sunrisers  (representing Middlesex, Essex, Northamptonshire, Bedfordshire, Cambridgeshire, Hertfordshire, Huntingdonshire, Norfolk and Suffolk)
 The Blaze (representing Derbyshire, Leicestershire, Nottinghamshire and Lincolnshire)
 Western Storm (representing Glamorgan, Gloucestershire, Somerset, Cornwall, Devon, Wiltshire and Cricket Wales)

Standings
Teams receive 4 points for a win. A bonus point will be given where the winning team's run rate is 1.25 or greater times that of the opposition. In case of a tie in the standings, the following tiebreakers are applied in order: highest net run rate, team that scored the most points in matches involving the tied parties, better bowling strike rate, drawing of lots.

 advances to Final
 advances to the Semi-final

Fixtures

Group stage
Source:

Finals Day

Semi-final

Final

References

External links
 Tournament home at ESPNcricinfo

Charlotte Edwards Cup
2023 in English women's cricket